Ian James Poulter (born 10 January 1976) is an English professional golfer who plays in the LIV Golf League. He has previously been ranked as high as number 5 in the world rankings. The highlights of Poulter's career to date have been his two World Golf Championship wins at the 2010 WGC-Accenture Match Play Championship and the 2012 WGC-HSBC Champions. He is the touring professional for Woburn Golf and Country Club.

Early career
Born in Hitchin, and raised in Stevenage, Poulter took up the game at the age of four when his single-handicap father, Terry, gave him a cut-down 3-wood. His older brother Danny is also a professional golfer. Unable to get a place as a pro at a private club, he became the assistant pro and golf shop manager at the Chesfield Downs Golf Club. There he was forced by his boss to pay a full green fee every time he wanted to play in a competition. His handicap hence stayed at four, because he did not play in competitions. Following this period, Poulter joined as Assistant Pro at Leighton Buzzard golf course, giving lessons to youngsters at £1 per lesson.

Professional career
Poulter turned professional in 1996 gaining his first win at the 1999 Open de Côte d'Ivoire on the European Tour's second tier Challenge Tour. He won promotion to the European Tour itself via the qualifying school later that year.

In his first season, he claimed the Italian Open title and was the Sir Henry Cotton Rookie of the Year for 2000. Further wins followed in each of the next four seasons, most prestigiously the season ending "tour championship" the Volvo Masters in 2004. He was in the top ten on the Order of Merit in 2003, 2004, 2006, 2009, 2010 and 2012. In 2013, he finished 2nd on the Order of Merit, his highest placing so far.

After narrowly missing a place in the 2002 European Ryder Cup team, Poulter was a member of the victorious squad in 2004, where he officially scored the winning points for his team. This entitled him to take up membership of the PGA Tour in 2005, and he has divided his time between the two tours since then.

At the 2008 Masters Tournament, Poulter made a hole-in-one at the 16th hole at Augusta National in the first round. At the 2008 Open Championship, Poulter had the clubhouse lead on the last round before being beaten by defending champion Pádraig Harrington. In the 2008 Ryder Cup, Poulter was the highest points scorer on either side as he scored 4 of Europe's 11.5 points. Europe lost the Ryder Cup 16.5–11.5.

In the 2009 Players Championship, he finished in sole possession of second place at eight under-par, four shots behind the winner, Henrik Stenson. In November 2009, Poulter won the Barclays Singapore Open at the Sentosa Club. He moved into the top-10 of the Official World Golf Ranking in January 2010 with a second-place finish at the Abu Dhabi Golf Championship.

In February 2010, he won his first tournament on U.S. soil, beating fellow Englishman Paul Casey 4&2 in the final of the WGC-Accenture Match Play Championship in Arizona. The win moved him to 5th in the world rankings. His ranking gained Poulter a place in the 2010 Ryder Cup in September at Celtic Manor in Wales He won 3 points in the 4 matches he played in the European team's win by 14.5 points to 13.5. In November 2010, he won his second title of the year with a one-stroke victory in the UBS Hong Kong Open.

On 23 February 2011, in Marana, Arizona, Poulter became the first defending champion in nine years to be eliminated in the first round of the WGC-Accenture Match Play Championship. He did however enjoy greater success in the European Tour's own match play event, the Volvo World Match Play Championship where he won the title beating Ryder Cup teammate Luke Donald, 2&1, in the final. He had previously beaten the world number one Lee Westwood, Francesco Molinari and Nicolas Colsaerts to get to the final. This was Poulter's second tournament win in a match play event and eleventh European Tour victory.

Poulter was one of José María Olazábal's two "captains picks" for the European Team at the 2012 Ryder Cup. He won all the 4 matches he played over the three days of the event, and was a key figure in sparking his team's victory by 14.5 points to 13.5.

On 4 November 2012, Poulter won the second World Golf Championship of his career at the WGC-HSBC Champions in Shenzhen, China, coming from four strokes back in the final round to win by two from four other players. He shot a final round of 65 which included 8 birdies in his first 15 holes to seize control and despite a late bogey, closed out the victory by two strokes. He became only the second European to have won multiple WGC events, after Darren Clarke. The victory took Poulter to 15th in the rankings.

At the 2015 Honda Classic on the PGA Tour, Poulter had a three shot lead going into the final round of the rain delayed event. However he had a disastrous four-over-par final round of 74, where he found the water five times, included twice on the 14th hole which cost him a triple bogey. Poulter would finish in a tie for third, one shot outside of the playoff, which was won by Pádraig Harrington. It was his first 54-hole lead on the PGA Tour and he never would win a non-WGC PGA Tour event until 2018. In the same year, Poulter was in a predicament. He fell to 51st in the OWGR and was not exempt for the WGC-HSBC Champions, and had failed to enter the UBS Hong Kong Open. He was also at risk of losing his European Tour card since he had only played in 12 events, one short of membership and Ryder Cup eligibility. He only earned entry to the Hong Kong Open after Rich Beem gave up his sponsor exemption to allow Poulter to compete.

In March 2016, Poulter held the 54-hole lead at the Puerto Rico Open, an alternate event on the PGA Tour. He led by one stroke entering the final round, but shot an even-par round which included just the one birdie, to finish in a tie for third, one stroke outside of the playoff. This was only the second time that Poulter had held a 54-hole lead in an event on the PGA Tour and he has yet to win one. The result was however his best on tour for over a year.

On 3 June 2016, Poulter was ruled out of the upcoming Ryder Cup after being sidelined for four months with a foot injury. Only three days later, he was named by captain Darren Clarke as one of his vice-captains for the match.

Poulter started the 2016–17 season using a major medical extension. He initially failed to meet the terms, but his results and criteria were reevaluated, allowing Poulter to keep his Tour card for the remainder of the season. The Golf Channel website also mentioned that Brian Gay (who was also playing on a major medical extension) noted a discrepancy in the points distribution from the previous season. After recalculating, Gay and Poulter were also allowed entry into the 2017 Players Championship after meeting the FedEx Cup requirements. Poulter went on to finish T2 at The Players, three shots behind Kim Si-woo.

During the 2018 WGC-Match Play, Poulter was informed by members of the media that his advancement to the quarterfinals would place him in the top-50 in the World Golf Rankings, ensuring his place in the Masters' field two weeks later. It was later determined that he would need to advance to the semifinals to crack the top-50, which he was unable to do, losing heavily to Kevin Kisner in the quarterfinals.

The following week, Poulter won the Houston Open, claiming his third victory on the PGA Tour and first stroke play tournament win in the United States. Poulter won in a sudden-death playoff, after holing a lengthy birdie putt on the final green of regulation play to tie Beau Hossler. In the playoff, Poulter won with a par, after Hossler found the water and made a triple bogey. This was Poulter's first win in six years on any tour and also sealed his place in the Masters the following week as the final entrant. He finished T44 at the event. Then playing his sixth week in a row, Poulter held the 54-hole lead at the RBC Heritage. He faded in the final round though, shooting a 75 and finishing T7.

In September 2018, Poulter was named as a captain's pick by Thomas Bjørn for the European team participating in the 2018 Ryder Cup. Europe defeated the United States team by 17½ points to 10½ at Le Golf National outside of Paris, France. Poulter went 2–2–0 and won his singles match against then world number one Dustin Johnson.

In September 2021, Poulter was a captain's pick by Pádraig Harrington for the European team in the 2021 Ryder Cup at Whistling Straits in Kohler, Wisconsin. The U.S. team won 19–9 and Poulter went 1–2–0 and won his Sunday singles match against Tony Finau.

Poulter was announced as a participant of the inaugural LIV Golf Invitational Series tournament at the Centurion Club near London in June 2022, with his PGA Tour and European Tour memberships being suspended. His suspension on the European Tour was temporarily lifted in July, pending a court case set for February 2023. Poulter's best finish in the LIV Golf Invitational Series came in Bangkok, where he finished in a tie for 12th.

Clothing
Poulter is well known for his eccentric dress sense, inspired by his mother, who managed the Letchworth branch of UK women's fashion chain Dorothy Perkins. His most famous pieces include trousers featuring the famous Claret Jug, worn at both the 2005 and 2006 Open Championships. Commentating for the BBC, Seve Ballesteros jibed that this was "the closest [Poulter] would ever get to it".

He is an avid fan of football club Arsenal. He has on several occasions appeared with the team's crest on his shoes, and he even controversially wore the team's shirt during an event, gaining widespread ire for flying in the face of golfing tradition (immediately after the event the rule was changed to stop future players wearing football jerseys). In addition to his golfing career, Poulter launched Ian Poulter Design (IJP Design) in 2007.

Personal life
Poulter is married to his wife Katie Poulter; the couple have four children and live in Lake Nona Golf & Country Club in Orlando, Florida. The couple also has a home in Milton Keynes, Buckinghamshire.

Poulter appears in the sports documentary series Full Swing, which premiered on Netflix on February 15, 2023.

Car collection 
Poulter is an avid Ferrari collector and maintains a collection of cars in Florida. His garage and car collection were covered in depth in a video by Shmee150.

The collection includes:

 Ferrari 275 GTB/4
 Ferrari 288 GTO
 Ferrari Testarossa
 Ferrari Enzo
 Ferrari LaFerrari
 Ferrari LaFerrari Aperta
 Ferrari 458 Speciale Aperta, created in white, green, and red to match the Italian flag
 Ferrari F12tdf
 2017 Ford GT

Poulter's $7 million LaFerrari Aperta featured in a viral video posted to his Instagram account in which Poulter chips a golf ball through the windows of the car.

Sponsorships
Poulter currently has endorsements with the following companies: Coolsculpting, IJP Design, Aurae Lifestyle, Titleist, Nikon, EA Sports, MasterCard, Oakley, Fathead, DP World, Audemars Piguet, and Marquis Jet.

Professional wins (17)

PGA Tour wins (3)

PGA Tour playoff record (1–0)

European Tour wins (12)

*Note: The 2002 Italian Open Telecom Italia was shortened to 54 holes due to rain.
1Co-sanctioned by the Asian Tour

European Tour playoff record (1–1)

Japan Golf Tour wins (1)

PGA Tour of Australasia wins (1)

Challenge Tour wins (1)

Other wins (1)

Results in major championships
Results not in chronological order in 2020.

CUT = missed the half-way cut
WD = withdrew
"T" indicates a tie for a place
NT = No tournament due to COVID-19 pandemic

Summary

Most consecutive cuts made – 7 (2004 Open Championship – 2006 U.S. Open)
Longest streak of top-10s – 2 (2012 Open Championship – 2012 PGA)

Results in The Players Championship

CUT = missed the halfway cut
"T" indicates a tie for a place
C = Cancelled after the first round due to the COVID-19 pandemic

World Golf Championships

Wins (2)

Results timeline
Results not in chronological order before 2015.

1Cancelled due to 9/11
2Cancelled due to COVID-19 pandemic

QF, R16, R32, R64 = Round in which player lost in match play
"T" = Tied
NT = No tournament
Note that the HSBC Champions did not become a WGC event until 2009.
Note that the Championship and Invitational were discontinued from 2022.

Team appearances
Ryder Cup (representing Europe): 2004 (winners), 2008, 2010 (winners), 2012 (winners), 2014 (winners), 2018 (winners), 2021

World Cup (representing England): 2001, 2007, 2008, 2009, 2011, 2018
Seve Trophy (representing Great Britain & Ireland): 2003 (winners), 2005 (winners), 2011 (winners)
EurAsia Cup (representing Europe): 2016 (winners)

See also
List of golfers with most European Tour wins

Notes

References

External links

Ian Poulter's IJP Design

English male golfers
European Tour golfers
PGA Tour golfers
LIV Golf players
Ryder Cup competitors for Europe
Sportspeople from Buckinghamshire
Sportspeople from Hitchin
People from Milton Keynes
English expatriates in the United States
1976 births
Living people